Mangal, born in Laghman Province, is a prominent Afghan singer who started in the early 1970s. He and his ex-wife, Naghma, were a popular duo during the 1970s and early 1990s. Mangal sings in Pashto and Dari. His music is popular in Afghanistan, and Pakistan.

Career
Mangal was born in Laghman, Afghanistan. As a young boy, he developed an interest in music. Mangal joined with a musician-turned-singer Naghma, a Pashtun from Kandahar Province of Afghanistan, and eventually married her. Mangal has since divorced from Naghma, remarried and resides in California.

With impending civil war, the couple left Afghanistan for Pakistan in 1992. There, they became very successful with an enthusiastic crowd of Afghan exiles who were nostalgic for their native music. Their financial situation by this time had improved significantly. In the late 1990s, they left Pakistan and immigrated to the United States.

After establishing contact with the Afghan community of northern California, the duo held a series of performances. Mangal and Naghma have four children, two sons and two daughters. Their divorce has also cast a doubt as to whether this former pair can reconcile at least on the professional level. While Mangal performs solo in private events and television programs, Mangal is continuing his career as a professional artist. He is known to be very patriotic of Afghan culture and has dedicated many songs to Afghanistan.

References

20th-century Afghan male singers
Living people
Afghan expatriate musicians in Pakistan
Year of birth missing (living people)
21st-century Afghan male singers